KBGH, UHF analog channel 19, was an independent non-commercial educational television station serving Twin Falls, Idaho, United States that was licensed to Filer. The station's transmitter was located on Flat Top Butte near Jerome. Owned by the Twin Falls-based College of Southern Idaho (CSI), KBGH existed strictly as a means of providing telecourses and distance learning.

History
An original construction permit for a full-service station was granted to CSI on November 3, 1992. The call letters KBGH were granted on May 14, 1993. Although it was to be a full-service station, its permit specified a low-power 75.9 kW ERP signal. The station commenced broadcasting July 6, 1999.

KBGH was granted a construction permit to construct a digital television station on channel 18, on February 22, 2001. However, CSI had elected not to transition KBGH to a digital facility. On February 17, 2009, the original day of national digital transition, KBGH completely ceased operations. On March 31, 2009, the FCC officially deleted KBGH's callsign.

Since the shut down, CSI has implemented a fully digital online telecommunication system, whereby students at distant sites can participate via the Internet.

Paradoxically, if CSI initially had applied for a license for a LPTV station instead of as a full-service station, it would have remained free to continue analogue broadcasts after the original February 2009 deadline, though it would be required to convert to digital or close down by September 1, 2015.

Programming
CSI used KBGH solely as a means of delivering telecourses to students. When the station was not broadcasting a telecourse, it had no programming at all—only a blank picture was transmitted.

References

External links
College of Southern Idaho official site

BGH
Television channels and stations established in 1999
1999 establishments in Idaho
Television channels and stations disestablished in 2009
2009 disestablishments in Idaho
Defunct television stations in the United States
Educational and instructional television channels
BGH